The River Effra is a former set of streams in south London, England, culverted and used mainly for storm sewerage. It had been a tributary of the Thames. Its catchment waters, where not drained to aquifer soakaways and surface water drains, have been incorporated into 1850s-built combined sewer sectors, devised by Sir Joseph Bazalgette. One drains Peckham, the other Brixton, then intended to flow towards Peckham. These generally flow east to be treated at Crossness.

When it rains these sectors can purposefully backup and overflow in two Effra sewers that mirror a known and, from the study of medieval records, a suspected distributary. At least four of these limbs can operate to enable overflow, as opposed to normal flow, and it is not known how many Southwark distributaries ran before the known diversion to Vauxhall was made in the 13th century. Overflows reach two combined sewer overflows that will discharge into the Thames Tideway Tunnel on its completion in 2025. The 13th century ending, a WNW cut – then a dyke – was dug to cut across a low plain of the strip parish of Lambeth and is emulated by a key section of the Southern Low Level Interceptor sewer.

Etymology
The etymology of the name "Effra" has been much disputed.

There is no evidence that it was applied to the stream before the late 18th century, and early 19th century gazetteers gave it no name. A map of 1744 refers to it as the "Shore", and it was also referred to as "Brixton Creek" and "the Wash".

Bonner notes "" ("high bank") in a charter of 693 CE records a spot on the bank of the Thames.

A 1956 suggestion is the corruption of "Heathrow", a small, late, subinfeudated manor of 70 acres south of Coldharbour Lane and east of Effra Road (a Victorian naming). By the 1790s it was known as Effra Farm. There is evidence that the name was first applied to the stream at Brixton, perhaps taken from the name of the farm, and was only later extended to the rest of its channels. A 2016 book by the Lambeth borough archivist supports this view, suggesting that other etymologies are a product of 19th century antiquarianism.

History

Before the 19th century

The drainage basin of the stream covered around 20 square kilometres (8 sq miles) of present-day inner south London. Historically the Effra was fed partly by a line of springs that emerged at between 80 and 100 metres above sea level along the 5 km ridge of the Great North Wood, where a layer of gravels overlies the impermeable London Clay. There were also springs at a lower level in Dulwich; the various tributaries met near Brixton before flowing to the Thames.

The lowest part of the river was diverted as early as the 13th century, after the monks of Bermondsey Priory made an agreement with neighbouring landowners to end flooding problems. Before that time the river's course ran either into Walworth Marsh, which after draining became Walworth Common, or into the Earl's Sluice to reach the Thames. The lower, northern part of the river appeared in Ogilby's Britannia of 1675 as the "New River".

While the upper, southern parts of the river were rural, they became increasingly suburbanised as the 19th century went on. The art critic John Ruskin, who grew up at Herne Hill close to one of the Effra's tributaries, described "the good I got out of the tadpole-haunted ditch in Croxted Lane", and made an early sketch of a bridge over it.

Until about 1850 Brixton Road, where it ran along the course of the stream, was known as the "Washway", and the stream itself was often called the "Wash". By that time the Effra was heavily polluted with domestic waste, due to increasing development along its course, and by 1821 it was classed as an open sewer downstream of North Brixton. It still often flooded in heavy rain, and residents of Brixton Road and South Lambeth repeatedly complained of their houses being inundated. In 1847 the commissioners of the Surrey and East Kent Sewers, under the direction of surveyor Joseph Gwilt, carried out works "arching over" (culverting) the Effra as far upstream as Herne Hill.

Post-industrial revolution
When the London sewerage system was constructed during the mid-19th century, its designer Sir Joseph Bazalgette incorporated flows from the Effra into the southern half of the system. The about   Effra Branch Sewer cost £19,400 to build, received all but the Brixton outfall of the Effra could safely withstand and runs from Dulwich and Norwood into the Southern High Level Interceptor Sewer at Croxted Lane. This itself continues east from Herne Hill under Peckham and New Cross to Deptford. Here it joins its low-level counterpart, which picks up non-overflow effluent from the old depression converted to sewer at Vauxhall (routed via Kennington and Burgess Park to Deptford); the two branches merge to form the Southern Outfall Sewer that similarly drains Greenwich and Woolwich for treatment at Crossness works.

As the drainage basin urbanised, most visible headwaters were incorporated into surface water local solutions or the combined sewer Effra successors. Some remained open and marked on Ordnance Survey maps until the later 19th century. A local moderately foul flow can be seen through a drainage grate in the crypt of St. Luke's Church, West Norwood.

Course

The river was fed by all water falling on the inside and north of the very broad Norwood Ridge. Much of this coalesced south-east of Brixton, the remainder at the border of Camberwell and Peckham to flow to an ambiguous distributary in Southwark (see final paragraph below).

The main branch rose near Harold Road in Upper Norwood Recreation Ground, and flowed through West Norwood. Where Norwood High Street merges at the fountain with the A215 to form Norwood Road, it was joined by a brook from Knights Hill ward.

A second branch rose south of Gipsy Hill and ran into West Dulwich via Croxted Road, after flowing from near the Westow House inn, Westow Hill. Beyond the Paxton pub opposite the end of Gipsy Hill the Effra Branch sewer drains Hamilton Road, forms the back garden line of Croxted Road and joins the other tributary at the South Circular Road, where it now forms the sewers of Croxted Road, Dulwich Road, Dalberg Road, Effra Road, Electric Lane, and Brixton Road. 
 
East along the watershed, springs rose in Dulwich Wood, flowing through Belair Park and beneath North Dulwich to Herne Hill. Still further to the east a tributary called the Ambrook rose from springs in Sydenham Hill Wood and Peckarmans Wood, flowing to Herne Hill through present-day Dulwich Park, where its heavily landscaped channel is visible. The longest and easternmost tributary ran from Eliot Bank and Horniman Park in Forest Hill down to Herne Hill.
Rocque's map of 1746 called these confluences around Herne Hill railway station "Island Green". These tributaries are no longer visible above ground: save for the Ambrook, which still flows seasonally in Sydenham Hill Wood.

The Effra flowed generally NNW until it reached its splayed lower channels (distributaries), north of Brixton. At this point a key one turned northeast and then east, running through the grounds of Bermondsey Priory. Others fed Lambeth and possibly Walworth Marshes, and may have joined the Earl's Sluice, which entered the Thames at Deptford Wharf. After diversion in the 13th century, it ran directly west from Kennington to join the Thames at Vauxhall.

Folklore

A local story tells of a coffin found floating down the Thames in Victorian times, which was traced back to West Norwood Cemetery. Cemetery staff were puzzled to find that the plot the coffin had come from was undisturbed. Further investigation revealed that the ground beneath the grave had subsided, and the entire coffin had fallen into the underground Effra river, floating downstream to Vauxhall and entering the Thames. The song “Down in the Effra” by British folk band The Effras was written about this account.

Flooding
Until 1935 a key part of the combined sewer flooded during heavy rains every decade or so; an inscription on a white stone tablet high up the side of a building in Elder Road, West Norwood reads: "FLOOD LEVEL 17th July 1890".

After a three-hour-long storm on 14 June 1914 this section overflowed again and flooded houses along its path from Elder Road to Chestnut Roadlocals evacuated their damaged homes for several days. Further floods in the 1920s prompted works to enlarge the Effra Branch. This was sufficient until a very small number of homes flooded during the powerful downpours of 20 July 2007.

The Unearthing the Effra Campaign
In 1992 a project by the London arts group Platform sparked a local campaign to dig up the river. The Unearthing the Effra project was based around a mock Effra Redevelopment Agency, which included a public office. The project gained publicity in local newspapers and radio stations before the journalists noticed that the group had scattered, the whole thing being a stunt carried out in the name of art.

See also
Tributaries of the River Thames
Subterranean rivers of London
List of rivers of England

Notes and references
Notes 
  
References
 
Referred to in John Constantine's "Hellblazer 238" as a gateway to "shadow London"

External links
The Effra
Walking the River Effra
Platform's Unearthing the Effra project. 
http://www.londonslostrivers.com/river-effra.html

Rivers of London
Subterranean rivers of London
Geography of the London Borough of Southwark
Geography of the London Borough of Croydon
Geography of the London Borough of Lambeth
Dulwich
1Effra